Kharwa Chanda railway station is a small railway station in Udaipur district, Rajasthan. Its code is KRCD. It serves the villages of Kharwa and Keora Khurd.

Kharwa Chanda railway station is part of the Ahmedabad–Udaipur line, which is undergoing gauge conversion, from metre to broad gauge. The station is located on a new alignment of the line, 1.2 km northeast from its former position.

References 

Ajmer railway division
Railway stations in Udaipur district